Upton Site may refer to:
Upton Site, an archaeological site listed on the National Register of Historic Places near Deming, New Mexico
Archeological Site 38CK1, an archaeological site listed on the National Register of Historic Places also known as Upton Site near Gaffney, South Carolina